The Pedigree State Stop Race is a stage stop sled dog race that takes place annually in the US States of Wyoming and Idaho. The race starts in Jackson, Wyoming and makes stops in Driggs, Idaho, and the following Wyoming cities: Alpine, Pinedale, Lander, Big Piney/Marbleton, Kemmerer, and Uinta, totaling 302 miles. It makes one stop in Idaho in Driggs. It is the second largest sled dog race in the country.

The 2017 champion was Streeper Kennels' Canadian dog team led by Buddy Streeper. Streeper took home a check of $12,000 after racing 302-miles in 23 hours, 7 minutes and 58 seconds.

See also
 Animal racing

References

External links

Dog sledding races
Sports competitions in Wyoming
Sports competitions in Idaho